Tam Chun Hei (born on August 2, 1993) is a badminton player from Hong Kong. He is 172 cm tall. He lives in Hong Kong. He made his International Debut in 2009, at the Macau Open Grand Prix Gold.

Early life 
He began playing badminton at age 15. He has been a National Team Member since age 16.

Career 
Tam Chun Hei participated in the Badminton Junior World Championships in 2009, 2010 and 2011. In 2010 and 2011 he was in the main draw of the Hong Kong Super Series, in 2011 and 2012 in the main draw of the Macau Open. He finished third at the German Juniors 2012. At the Badminton Asia Cup 2013, he retired in the first round.

Achievements

References 

1993 births
Living people
Hong Kong male badminton players
Badminton players at the 2018 Asian Games
Asian Games competitors for Hong Kong